FNLC may refer to:
the National Front for the Liberation of Corsica
the Front for the National Liberation of the Congo, in the late 1970s